4W or 4-W may refer to:

Units of measurement
4°W, or 4th meridian west, a longitude coordinate
4 watts
4 weeks
4 wins, abbreviated in a Win–loss record (pitching)

Transportation
SLC-4W, designation for one of two launch pads at Vandenberg Air Force Base Space Launch Complex 4
AD-4W, a model of Douglas A-1 Skyraider
4-wheel vehicle, especially vehicles with four wheel drive
BP-4W, a model of Mazda B engine
4w (locomotive), a type of locomotive under the Whyte notation

Other
04W, a designation for Typhoon Nina (1975)
4W, the production code for the 1977 Doctor Who serial The Sun Makers

See also
W4 (disambiguation)